In March 2021, a wave of Taiwanese people changed their legal names to include the word "salmon" to take advantage of a promotion by the Japanese conveyor belt sushi chain Sushiro. The chain offered free sushi to guests whose names included the word. This phenomenon was dubbed the "salmon chaos" by English-language media. The incident garnered significant criticism by public figures and the general population.

Background 
On May 20, 2015, the Name Act was amended to allow three legal name changes under six circumstances, including if:

This condition was interpreted as allowing for any name a person wants. Three days after the act was amended, Huang Hong-cheng changed his name to the fifteen-character-long "", which Taiwan News translates as "Taiwan’s World’s Greatest Man, President, and God of Wealth". His name was the longest in Taiwan until the salmon chaos.

Incident 
Between March 10 and March 21, 2021, Sushiro ran an advertising campaign revolving around salmon sushi. On March 15, Sushiro began advertising an upcoming promotion through their Facebook page: on March 17 and 18, people whose names are homophones with the Chinese word for salmon (鮭魚, guīyú) could dine at discounted prices. Additionally, people whose names had the exact characters for salmon could eat for free with up to five other people.

On March 16, a comedic news channel owned by the Internet forum CK101 posted to Facebook a picture of three identification cards of university students with the names "Liao Salmon", "Zhangjian Salmon", and "Liu Pinhan Handsome Salmon". The post quickly became viral on the Internet, leading to more people following suit and changing their names, intending to change them back after the promotion ended. The record for longest name was repeatedly broken: it was first 36 characters, then 40 characters, then 50 characters. In a widely publicized story, a Taichung university student used his third and final name change into "Zhang Salmon Dream" and was horrified upon learning that it would be permanent. Taichung's Civil Affairs Bureau indicated that he had only changed his name twice, and urged him to change it back. The Liberty Times reported that by March 19, at least 332 people changed their name for the event.

Reactions 
Government officials and politicians condemned the name changes. Some employees at Household Registration Offices, which processes the name changes, reportedly tried to persuade applicants against changing their names, with varying degrees of success. Deputy Minister of the Interior Chen Tsung-yen remarked, "this kind of name change not only wastes time but causes unnecessary paperwork." 

The public's reaction to the name changes were generally negative. Multiple writers commented on a "split" in ethical values between older and younger generations. Criticism was also targeted against food waste generated during the craze, after images of people only eating the fish and leaving behind the rice surfaced online. After foreign news agencies reported on the story, multiple Taiwanese news outlets called the incident an "international embarrassment."

Writer  defended the name changes, saying that "there's nothing wrong with being greedy and saving money."

Notes

References

External links 
 Sushiro's original Facebook post

2021 in Taiwan
2021 controversies
Salmon
Fish in human culture